An independence referendum was held in French Algeria on 1 July 1962. It followed French approval of the Évian Accords in an April referendum. Voters were asked whether Algeria should become an independent state, co-operating with France; 99.72% voted in favour with a voter turnout of 91.88%.

Following the referendum, France declared Algeria to be independent on 3 July; the decision was published in the official journal the following day, and Algerian leaders declared 5 July (the 132nd anniversary of the French arrival in Algiers) to be Independence Day. When Algeria ceased to be part of France it also ceased being part of the European Communities.

Background
The Algerian War was started by members of the National Liberation Front (FLN) with the Toussaint Rouge attacks on 1 November 1954. Conflicts proliferated in France, including the May 1958 Algerian crisis that led to the fall of the Fourth Republic. French forces used brutal means of attempting to suppress Algerian nationalists, alienating support in metropolitan France and discrediting French prestige abroad.

In 1960, French President Charles de Gaulle agreed to negotiations with the FLN after major demonstrations in Algiers and other cities. A 1961 referendum on allowing self-determination for Algeria was approved by 75% of voters (including 70% of those voting in Algeria). Negotiations concluded with the signing of the Évian Accords in March 1962, which were approved by 91% of voters in a referendum on 8 April.

Results
The referendum question was phrased:"Do you want Algeria to become an independent state, co-operating with France under the conditions defined in the declarations of 19 March 1962?"

Aftermath
In accordance with the Évian accords (Chapter III.3) France was allowed to maintain its Mers El Kébir naval base for fifteen years. However, all forces were withdrawn in 1967. 

Canadian historian John C. Cairns stated in 1962 that:

References

Algeria
Referendums in Algeria
1962 in Algeria
Algeria
Referendums related to the European Union
Withdrawal from the European Union
Referendums in Overseas France
1962 in the European Economic Community